Idridgehay and Alton is a civil parish in the Amber Valley district of Derbyshire, England.  The parish contains 27 listed buildings that are recorded in the National Heritage List for England.  Of these, one is listed at Grade II*, the middle of the three grades, and the others are at Grade II, the lowest grade.  The parish contains the villages of Idridgehay and Alton and the surrounding countryside.  Most of the listed buildings are houses, cottages and associated structures, farmhouses and farm buildings.  The other listed buildings include former watermills, a public house, a church, a railway station, and the former stationmaster's house.


Key

Buildings

References

Citations

Sources

 

Lists of listed buildings in Derbyshire